The Finance Act 2009 (c 10) is an Act of the Parliament of the United Kingdom. It amends the law in relation to pensions, Income Tax, Capital Gains Tax, Corporation Tax, Value Added Tax, stamp taxes, alcohol and tobacco duties, gambling duties, Vehicle Excise Duty, fuel duty, Climate Change Levy, Landfill Tax and other environmental taxes and duties.

Commencement
The following Orders have been made under this Act to bring parts of it into force:
The Finance Act 2009, Section 96 and Schedule 48 (Appointed Day, Savings and Consequential Amendments) Order 2009 (S.I. 2009/3054 (C. 133))
The Finance Act 2009, Schedule 56 (Appointed Day and Consequential Provisions) Order 2010 (S.I. 2010/466 (C. 31))
The Finance Act 2009, Section 94 (Appointed Day) Order 2010 (S.I. 2010/574 (C. 40))
The Finance Act 2009, Paragraph 12(2)(b) of Schedule 22 (Appointed Day) Order 2010 (S.I. 2010/670 (C. 43))
The Finance Act 2009, Schedule 50 (Record-keeping) (Appointed Day) Order 2010 (S.I. 2010/815 (C. 55))
The Finance Act 2009, Schedule 51 (Time Limits for Assessments, Claims, etc.) (Appointed Days and Transitional Provisions) Order 2010 (S.I. 2010/867 (C. 58))
The Finance Act 2009, Sections 101 to 103 (Appointed Day and Supplemental Provision) Order 2010 (S.I. 2010/1878 (C. 96))
The Finance Act 2009, Sections 101 to 103 (Income Tax Self Assessment) (Appointed Days and Transitional and Consequential Provisions) Order 2011 (S.I. 2011/701 (C. 26))
The Finance Act 2009, Schedules 55 and 56 (Income Tax Self Assessment and Pension Schemes) (Appointed Days and Consequential and Savings Provisions) Order 2011 (S.I. 2011/702 (C. 27))

See also
Finance Act

References
Halsbury's Statutes,

External links
The Finance Act 2009, as amended from the National Archives.
The Finance Act 2009, as originally enacted from the National Archives.
Explanatory notes to the Finance Act 2009.

United Kingdom Acts of Parliament 2009
Tax legislation in the United Kingdom